John Phillips Avlon (born January 19, 1973) is an American journalist and political commentator. He is a Senior Political Analyst and anchor at CNN and was the editor-in-chief and managing director of The Daily Beast from 2013 to 2018. Avlon was previously a columnist and associate editor for The New York Sun and chief speechwriter for former Mayor of New York City Rudy Giuliani.

Avlon is the author of several books, including Independent Nation: How Centrists Can Change American Politics (2004), which critically appraises both traditional American centrism and the more recent radical centrism. He also wrote Wingnuts: How the Lunatic Fringe is Hijacking America (2010). In January 2017, Avlon published Washington's Farewell: The Founding Father's Warning to Future Generations, in which he highlights the history and content of President George Washington's parting treatise to the American people in the context of the contemporary political climate.  His most recent book is Lincoln and the Fight for Peace. It is a historical analysis of Lincoln's rebuilding the nation from the Civil War and how those efforts carried on past his assassination.

Early life
Avlon was born in 1973 to Dianne Alexander (Phillips) and John Jeffrey Avlon, a lawyer and real estate executive with companies in Charleston, South Carolina and New York City. He is of Greek descent, and his grandparents were immigrants. He was educated at Milton Academy, an independent preparatory school in Milton, Massachusetts. He is a childhood friend and schoolmate of Matthew Pottinger. He earned his BA from Yale University and an MBA from Columbia University.

Career
Avlon started his career as the youngest speechwriter for Mayor Rudy Giuliani.  He was promoted to Chief Speechwriter and the Deputy Director of Policy. He prepared the mayor's addresses for the State of the City (1999 through 2001), testimony to Congress on homeland security, and address to the United Nations General Assembly on counterterrorism. He was also a senior fellow at the Manhattan Institute. He is an advisory board member of the Citizens Union of New York, Bronx Academy of Letters, and the Theodore Roosevelt Association.

Avlon joined The Daily Beast in 2008 one month after its launch.  He worked his way up through the organization starting as a columnist and moving on to political editor, executive editor and then managing editor.  In 2013 Avlon became editor-in-chief of The Daily Beast. By September 2014 the website reached a new record of 21 million unique visitors; it was a 60% year-over-year increase in readers, accompanied by a 300% increase in the overall size of its social media community. During Avlon's leadership The Daily Beast doubled its traffic to 1.1 million readers a day and won over 17 awards for journalistic excellence.

In May 2018, Avlon announced his departure from The Daily Beast and moving to CNN as Senior Political Analyst and Anchor. Barry Diller, chairman and senior executive of IAC, issued a statement shortly after Avlon announced his departure, "John Avlon has been a superb editorial leader of the Daily Beast. He’s built a formidable newsroom, and a culture of excellence and decency. I only wish him the best for the future, and greatly am appreciative of his bringing Noah Shachtman onboard as his deputy so that we’re in the position to continue the fine work of the Daily Beast."

Television
Avlon has made appearances on a variety of television shows such as, The Late Show with Stephen Colbert, The Daily Show, and Real Time with Bill Maher, as well as on news programs on MSNBC, PBS, CNN, and C-SPAN.

Avlon created and hosted the "Wingnut of the Week" segment on CNN. Syndicated columnist Kathleen Parker wrote that "Americans who are fed up with the Ann Coulter/Michael Moore school of debate, and are looking for someone to articulate a common sense middle path, may have found their voice in John Avlon."
 
Avlon first appeared on television in 2005 on the Daily Show with Jon Stewart to discuss his book Independent Nation. He credits this debut with the launch of his TV career.

In June 2018, Avlon moved to CNN full time as Senior Political Analyst making daily appearances on New Day, as well as guest anchoring for programs including State of America and Reliable Sources.  His segment "Reality Check" on CNN's New Day was referred to as "a standout, and a welcome feature on television in a current era lacking in reality-based news coverage." Digital news outlet Mediaite, in referring to Avlon's New Day segment said, "Need a fascinating but unexpected perspective on the news of the day? John Avlon’s recurring segment “Reality Check” is a hit."

Avlon has been interviewed in several documentaries including HBO's Breslin and Hamill: Deadline Artists, 2010's Gerrymandering and the forthcoming History Channel miniseries Washington.

In September 2021 CNN announced the debut of the digital series "Reality Check with John Avlon: Extremist Beat", which will track the rise of extremist groups in America. Avlon hopes the series can contextualize the history and development of these types of movements within American history saying, "At the end of the day, a lot of these things riff off older conspiracies. And I think by pulling out and drawing those connections, people can all of a sudden have perspective on what they may have been sucked into," explaining "we add that additional layer that I think is a lot more than what you get just by the daily thrust and parry of the news and chronicling the crazy."

Writing
Avlon has written numerous articles and essays. He wrote the Newsweek cover-story: "A 21st Century Statesman," (February 28, 2011), about actor, director and activist George Clooney. It was based in part on Avlon's trip accompanying Clooney to South Sudan to witness the referendum for independence from the North after two decades of civil war.

His essay on New York, "The Resilient City", written after the 9/11 attacks, was selected to conclude the anthology Empire City: New York Through the Centuries (2002). Fred Siegel, the author of The Future Once Happened Here, praised it as "the single best essay written in the wake of 9/11."

In 2010, Avlon published Wingnuts: How the Lunatic Fringe is Hijacking America about the evolution of fringe political movements and their inroads into mainstream American politics. Bill Clinton commented:

Wingnuts offers a clear and comprehensive review of the forces on the outer edges of the political spectrum that shape and distort our political debate. Shedding more heat than light they drive frustrated alienated citizens away from the reasoned discourse that can produce real solutions to our problems.

In 2011, Avlon co-edited the anthology Deadline Artists: America's Greatest Newspaper Columns with Jesse Angelo and Errol Louis. The book earned a starred review from Publishers Weekly prior to publication. The trio edited and published a sequel in 2012, Deadline Artists 2: Scandals, Tragedies and Triumphs. An opinion piece in The Washington Post described Deadline Artists as "one of the greatest collections of newspaper articles ever compiled" and saluted 'DA2' as "an equally superb sequel...may more siblings follow."

During the 2012 presidential campaign, Avlon was among the first reporters to suggest that Rick Santorum, rather than Mitt Romney, had won the narrow Iowa caucuses (Santorum was declared the victor weeks after the election night tally favored Romney).  In 2013, Avlon broke the news that Republican Congresswoman Michele Bachmann was under investigation by the Office of Congressional Ethics. The ethics investigation is thought to have contributed to her decision not to run for re-election.

In 2017, Avlon published Washington's Farewell: The Founding Father's Warning to Future Generations. His publisher released the book the day that President Barack Obama gave his farewell speech. American historian Richard Norton Smith said: 
It's hard to tell which is more nearly perfect—John Avlon's argument or his timing. In the wake of a dispiriting campaign, Avlon finds in Washington's Farewell Address a stunningly topical antidote to excessive partisanship and greedy self interest. His book is a stake through the heart of political extremism.

In April 2018 it was announced that Avlon was working on a book on Lincoln planned for release in 2020, focusing on the final five weeks of Lincoln's life and "his determination to reunite the nation through a radical new vision of winning the war by also winning the peace."
Avlon's book titled Lincoln and the Fight for Peace was released in February 2021.
  Filmmaker Ken Burns called the book a, “A stunning accomplishment, and an essential reminder that the Civil War – the most important event in our country’s history – is very much part of who we are as a people and a nation today.”  Additionally, author and presidential historian Douglas Brinkley says the book, "Brilliantly illuminates the enduring legacy of America's greatest president. With erudition and elegance, Avlon documents how Lincoln's sage political wisdom has helped democracy flourish." The New York Times said, "These are not unfamiliar tales to students of Lincoln, but Avlon makes the retelling affecting and powerful. At the same time, Avlon plays down the highly ideological Lincoln."

In July 2018, Kirkus Reviews called Avlon's contribution to the anthology Fight for Liberty: Defending Democracy in the Age of Trump, "Perhaps the best piece in the collection, who observes with considerable understatement that "America is living through a stark departure from its best political traditions."

Editorial approach
As Editor-in-Chief of The Daily Beast, Avlon has been cited for supporting original and breaking content for the platform.  "There's an explicit mandate," said Pulitzer Prize winning Daily Beast national security reporter Spencer Ackerman "from John Avlon that we are not in commodity news business. We have to break news. I am not in a position where, like at a lot of other places, I have to rewrite other peoples' stories. It's a seemingly trivial observation but has tremendous amount of impact."

Political activism
In 2010, Avlon became a founding leader of No Labels, a 501(c)(4) citizens movement of Republicans, Democrats and Independents whose mission is to address the politics of problem solving. Avlon also belongs to Reshape New York, a group that supports redistricting reform to end partisan gerrymandering by "proposing an independent, impartial and politically balanced citizens redistricting commission to draw fair district boundaries through a process that allows for ample public input."

In 2011, Mayor Michael Bloomberg appointed Avlon to the New York City Voter Assistance Advisory Committee. The VAAC advises the New York City Campaign Finance Board on its voter engagement mandates, including voter registration and participation outreach activities.

Associations
Avlon is on the board of Governors for the Overseas Press Club and the board of directors for the House of Speakeasy.

Honors
The National Society of Newspaper Columnists honored Avlon in 2011 for his online column in The Daily Beast; their citation read: "While [Avlon] brings a reporter's sensibility to his interviews and research, he infuses his accounts with witty judgments that contribute a strong, unapologetic perspective." In 2012 he won the NSNC award for the best online column.  In 2017 Avlon was named "One of the Most Influential in News Media" by Mediaite stating:

Besides steering one of the more influential online media outlets in the country, John Avlon is also a trusted, grounded and welcome voice on CNN (and Bill Maher) panels. While eschewing hard partisan tribalism for a more centrist approach, Avlon has still been one of the most vociferous Trump critics in this new world. The Daily Beast continues to thrive with Avlon at the helm.

Marriage and family
Avlon is married to PBS Firing Line host and political commentator Margaret Hoover. She is a great-granddaughter of President Herbert Hoover. They have a son Jack, born in 2013, and a daughter Toula Lou, born in 2015.

See also 
 New Yorkers in journalism
 Greek Americans
 List of Yale University people

References

External links 
 John Avlon's Website
 John Avlon at CNN
 Best of John Avlon on CNN
 John Avlon at The Daily Beast
 John Avlon on C-SPAN

1973 births
American columnists
American political writers
American male non-fiction writers
American speechwriters
CNN people
Harvard Kennedy School people
Hunter College faculty
Living people
Radical centrist writers
American people of Greek descent
Milton Academy alumni
Yale University alumni
Columbia Business School alumni
Manhattan Institute for Policy Research
Hoover family